Goshkur (also Romanized as Goshkūr) is a village in Shabkhus Lat Rural District, Rankuh District, Amlash County, Gilan Province, Iran. According to the 2006 census, its population was 297 individuals among 82 families.

References 

Populated places in Amlash County